Christopher Thomas Henchy (born 23 March 1964) is an American film director, film producer, and screenwriter. He is best known for being a creative collaborator with Will Ferrell, including co-creating the website Funny or Die and writing several Ferrell films, including Land of the Lost, The Other Guys and  The Campaign.

Early life
Henchy was born on 23 March 1964 in New York City, to Patricia and Michael Henchy, Ret. Col. He was raised in Augusta, Georgia, and attended Saint Mary on the Hill Catholic School. He graduated from Friendswood High School. He attended the University of New Mexico, where he received a B.S. degree in finance and was a member of the Sigma Alpha Epsilon chapter.

Career
After graduation, Henchy moved to New York City and worked on Wall Street. He later left his job and decided to work in comedy. He was hired by MTV and later wrote monologue jokes for Garry Shandling's The Larry Sanders Show.

Henchy went on to write for Campus Cops in 1996. After writing for a few television specials and some guest-writing stints on series, Henchy created and produced the television series Battery Park in 2000, which starred Elizabeth Perkins.

Henchy was a writer and producer for television sitcoms Spin City and Life With Bonnie. He created the sitcom I'm with Her with Marco Pennette, which was loosely based on Henchy's relationship with wife Brooke Shields. The show was cancelled by ABC after one season. Henchy later became the co-executive producer of Entourage and a producer on HBO's Eastbound & Down. He, along with Will Ferrell and Adam McKay, created the website Funny or Die. Henchy produced The Goods: Live Hard, Sell Hard. He is credited as a writer of the 2009 film Land of the Lost, The Other Guys and The Campaign which he also co-produced. In 2018, Henchy was announced to be directing a feature-length film for the television series Impractical Jokers with production work by Funny or Die. It was released in February 2020 under the name Impractical Jokers: The Movie.

Personal life

Henchy met actress, author and model Brooke Shields in 1999 on the Warner Bros lot. They became engaged in July 2000 while on vacation in Mexico and married on April 4, 2001. They have two daughters, Rowan Henchy and Grier Henchy. They reside in Greenwich Village, New York City.

Henchy serves on the Creative Council of Represent.Us, a nonpartisan anti-corruption organization.

References

External links
 

1964 births
Living people
American male screenwriters
American television writers
Television producers from New York City
Film producers from New York (state)
Funny or Die
American male television writers
Showrunners
University of New Mexico alumni
Writers from New York City
Writers from Augusta, Georgia
Screenwriters from New York (state)
Screenwriters from Georgia (U.S. state)
Television producers from Georgia (U.S. state)